Pierre Baragnon (24 November 1835, in Nîmes – 18 May 1892) was a French Legitimist politician. He was a member of the National Assembly from 1871 to 1876, a member of the Chamber of Deputies in 1878, and a Life Senator from 1878 to 1892.

References

External links
Assemble-nationale.fr

1835 births
1892 deaths
People from Nîmes
Politicians from Occitania (administrative region)
Legitimists
Members of the National Assembly (1871)
Members of the 2nd Chamber of Deputies of the French Third Republic
French life senators